Mesoclemmys perplexa is a species of turtle from Northeast Brazil.

References

perplexa
Turtles of South America
Reptiles of Brazil
Reptiles described in 2005